Eilema monochroma is a moth of the subfamily Arctiinae. It was described by William Jacob Holland in 1893. It is found in Gabon, Sierra Leone and South Africa.

References

monochroma
Moths described in 1893
Moths of Africa
Fauna of Gabon